Solanum campylacanthum is a species of flowering plant in the nightshade family Solanaceae. 

The species is very common as well as being widespread in grasslands, savannas, and woodlands. It can be found in eastern, central and southern Africa. 

The fruit of this species are poisonous but they have been used in traditional medicine.

References

campylacanthum
Flora of West-Central Tropical Africa
Flora of Northeast Tropical Africa
Flora of East Tropical Africa
Flora of South Tropical Africa
Flora of Southern Africa
Plants described in 1850
Medicinal plants